Beth Johnson may refer to:

 Beth Johnson (American politician) (1909–1973), member of the Florida House of Representatives and the Florida Senate
 Beth Johnson (mayor), mayor of Delta, British Columbia, Canada